Yuan Xindong is a retired professional wushu taolu athlete from Shanxi, China. He is a one-time world champion, and gold medalist at the 2001 East Asian Games and 2002 Asian Games. He is also a double gold medalist at the National Games of China. After his competitive career, he served as a coach of the Shanxi Wushu Team for a few years.

Yuan Xindong is a cousin of Yuan Wenqing and an uncle of Yuan Xiaochao.

See also 

 List of Asian Games medalists in wushu

References 

1997 births
Living people
Chinese wushu practitioners
Wushu practitioners at the 2002 Asian Games
Asian Games medalists in wushu
Asian Games gold medalists for China
Medalists at the 2002 Asian Games